Kevin Jones may refer to:

Kevin Jones (rugby league) (born 1964), British rugby league footballer of the 1980s and 1990s
Kevin Jones (BMX rider) (born 1967), rider in the sport of Flatland BMX
Kevin Jones (politician) (born 1974), member of the Kansas House of Representatives
Kevin Jones (footballer) (born 1974), Welsh professional association footballer
Kevin Jones (American football) (born 1982), American football running back
Kevin Jones (cricketer) (born 1986), English cricketer
Kevin Jones (basketball) (born 1989), American basketball player
Kevin Jones (musician), American jazz percussionist and bandleader
Kevin Jones (bowls), Canadian lawn bowler

See also
Kevin Jonas (born 1987), American musician, actor, contractor and entrepreneur